Gay's the Word may refer to:

 Gay's the Word (musical), a musical by Ivor Novello with lyrics by Alan Melville
 Gay's the Word (bookshop), a gay bookshop in London